Priesneriella is a genus of thrips in the family Phlaeothripidae.

Species
 Priesneriella citricauda
 Priesneriella clavicornis
 Priesneriella gnomus
 Priesneriella luctator
 Priesneriella mavromoustakisi
 Priesneriella seminole
 Priesneriella thomasi
 Priesneriella tubversicolor
 Priesneriella vercambrei

References

Phlaeothripidae
Thrips
Thrips genera